Jed Rees (born March 8, 1970) is a Canadian actor, best known for his roles in movies such as Galaxy Quest (1999), The Ringer (2005), Deadpool (2016), and American Made (2017).

Early life
Rees studied music for two years in college before transferring into Business Administration under the misconception that it would teach him how to make money. During his final year in school, he discovered acting and moved to New York City, where he studied theatre for two years.

Filmography

Awards and recognition

References

External links

1970 births
Living people
Male actors from Vancouver
Canadian male film actors
Canadian male television actors
Canadian male voice actors